To Hell in a Handcart (2001) is a controversial dystopian novel by English journalist Richard Littlejohn.

Mickey French is an ex-cop and firearms expert who was invalided out after many years in the profession. He and his family have a bad day out at a theme park and a social worker threatens his son with jail, helped by a bent lawyer. But Mickey has a get out of jail free card in the form of evidence that a top lawyer and a top cop broke the law in their early days. He uses it to get his son off.

The pair want the evidence back as it could ruin their careers so they employ a Romanian criminal who is in trouble with the police (and the Russian mafia) for a petty crime, to burn down Mickey's house, and the evidence. Mickey meanwhile has packed his family off to Florida (after local gypsies broke into his house, wrecked it and killed his cat as a warning to him) and not feeling like bed, nods off in a chair only to be woken up by the criminal entering his house.

Mickey hears the criminal enter and thinking the gypsies are back again wanting to hurt him or worse, he shoots and kills the criminal, then calls the police. After using self-defence against a man who had broken into his home, Mickey French finds himself arrested and faced with national notoriety, as Roberta Peel (the cop) and her lawyer friend seek to fit him up for murder. Unknown to Mickey, Peel has been in his house and took his evidence against her. However Mickey still has a trump card to play.

English novels
2001 British novels
Dystopian novels
HarperCollins books